The 1530s decade ran from January 1, 1530, to December 31, 1539.

References